Goochland County Public Schools is a school district which serves Goochland County, Virginia, United States. It is based in Goochland, Virginia. Enrollment hovers around 2600 students and the school division has five schools. Each of the five schools have been named Apple Distinguished Schools, 2019–2021, due to the division's strong one-to-one computing program. The superintendent is Dr. Jeremy Raley and the school board chairperson is J.D. Wright.

Schools
The district operates the following schools:
Byrd Elementary School 
Goochland Elementary School
Randolph Elementary School 
Goochland Middle School 
Goochland High School

All five of Goochland's schools have been fully-accredited by the state for over a decade. In 2018 and 2019, Niche.com rated Goochland County Public Schools the #1 school division in the Richmond metro-region.

Goochland High School has been recognized for its strong athletics program in addition to strong academics. In 2019, the on-time graduation rate was 97%.

In November 2009, the district's superintendent posted an FAQ on its website about the potential effects of budget cuts on services. It noted that some things, such as maximum class sizes, are mandated by state or federal law or policy, but other things including athletics are not. "Right now, everything that isn’t mandated or required by the state or federal government is being considered," the page said.

In September 1994, then superintendent Harold Absher went on voluntary leave from his position under unclear circumstances.

References

External links

Education in Goochland County, Virginia
School divisions in Virginia